Osakidetza-Basque Health Service is the institution created in 1984 in charge of the public healthcare system in the autonomous community of the Basque Country, belonging to the National Health System, created in 1986 and that substituted INSALUD.

The transfer of responsibilities to the Basque government in matters of healthcare was done during the administration of Carlos Garaikoetxea as Lehendakari, after the approval of the Statute of Autonomy of the Basque Country in 1979. It is a public healthcare service with a great number of facilities that take care of the needs of the Basque citizens. Its chief is the Secretary of Health of the Basque Government.

Main healthcare facilities

Araba 
 Araba University Hospital
 Leza Hospital
 Araba Integrated Sanitary Organization
 Rioja Alavesa Integrated Sanitary Organization
 Araba Mental Health Network

Gipuzkoa 
 Alto Deba Hospital
 Alto Deba Integrated Sanitary Organization
 Bidasoa Hospital 
 Bidasoa Integrated Sanitary Organization
 Debabarrena Integrated Sanitary Organization
 Donostialdea Integrated Sanitary Organization
 Donostia University Hospital
 Eibar Hospital
 Gipuzkoa Mental Health Network
 Goierri-Alto Urola Integrated Sanitary Organization
 Mendaro Hospital 
 Tolosaldea Integrated Sanitary Organization
 Zumarraga Hospital

Biscay 
 Barakaldo-Sestao Integrated Sanitary Organization
 Barrualde-Galdakao Integrated Sanitary Organization
 Bilbao-Basurto Integrated Sanitary Organization
 University Hospital Basurto (Bilbao)
 Santa Marina Hospital (Bilbao)
 Cruces University Hospital (Barakaldo)
 San Eloy Hospital (Barakaldo)
 Biscay Mental Health Network
 Ezkerraldea-Enkarterri-Cruces Integrated Sanitary Organization
 Galdakao-Usansolo Hospital
 Gernika Hospital
 Gorliz Hospital
 Urduliz-Alfredo Espinosa Hospital
 Uribe Integrated Sanitary Organization

See also 
 Spanish National Health System

References

External links 

 Osakidetza website

Companies established in 1984
Health care in Spain
Basque Country (autonomous community)